Kazuo Misaki   (born April 25, 1976) is a retired Japanese professional mixed martial artist. A professional competitor from 2001 until 2013, he was the 2006 PRIDE Welterweight (183 lbs) Grand Prix Champion, and also competed in Sengoku, Pancrase, DEEP, and Strikeforce. His 2010 bout with Jorge Santiago for the Sengoku Middleweight Championship was InsideMMA's "Fight of the Year."

Mixed martial arts career

Early career
Misaki started training judo in middle school. He later added kickboxing training in the Katori Dojo, and was finally introduced to mixed martial arts by Sanae Kikuta as part of his Grabaka team.

PRIDE
En route to the 2006 PRIDE Welterweight Grand Prix finals he defeated Phil Baroni and Dan Henderson in a non-title bout. Misaki was eliminated in the semifinals by Paulo Filho, but Filho injured his knee during the contest and was unable to continue to the finals. Misaki was named as his replacement and defeated Denis Kang by split decision.

His last fight in PRIDE was a unanimous decision loss to Frank Trigg at PRIDE 33 on February 24, 2007.

Post-PRIDE
At the Yarennoka event on New Year's Eve 2007, he fought Yoshihiro Akiyama. The original result of the match was a knockout victory for Misaki, but Akiyama protested the finish. The knockout kick came as Akiyama attempted to get back to his feet after being knocked down by Misaki. Akiyama contested that one or more of his hands were on the mat at the time of the kick, which would make the kick illegal under Yarennoka! rules. After reviewing video of the knockout, the Yarennoka executive committee agreed; the official result was then changed to "no contest."

Sengoku
He went on to fight in World Victory Road's inaugural event "Sengoku", on March 5, 2008, where he defeated Siyar Bahadurzada. and won by guillotine choke at 2:02 of the second round.

His next fight was at Sengoku 3 on June 8, 2008, where he beat Logan Clark by unanimous decision.

He then signed with Strikeforce in 2008, where he was scheduled to fight Joe Riggs but was forced to pull out due to injury.

Misaki then faced off against MWGP winner Jorge Santiago to determine WVR's first MW champion. Misaki was utilizing striking to keep Santiago at a distance, countering his kicks and punches. Misaki was dominating the fight until he got taken down and submitted in the final round.

On November 8, 2009 Misaki announced he was leaving his long-time gym GRABAKA.

Misaki recently lost to K-1 fighter Melvin Manhoef via a controversial stoppage at Dynamite!! 2009. Misaki was dropped by a punch from Manhoef and the referee stopped the fight before Manhoef could follow him to the ground.

Strikeforce
In his Welterweight debut, Misaki faced Paul Daley at Strikeforce: Tate vs. Rousey. He won the fight via split decision.

Retirement
After beating Paul Daley, Misaki retired from MMA competition.

Personal life

Legal troubles
On March 19, 2009, Misaki was pulled over by a police officer for talking on his cellphone while driving, when pulling over Misaki attempted to flee the scene, knocking into the arresting officers' car. On June 26, the Tokyo District Court sentenced him to one year of prison, which has been suspended for three years.

Misaki fought and beat Kazuhiro Nakamura at Sengoku 9, however he did not receive pay, and went on immediate indefinite suspension after the fight.

Championships and accomplishments
PRIDE Fighting Championships
2006 PRIDE Welterweight Grand Prix Champion
Sherdog
2010 Fight of the Year vs. Jorge Santiago
Inside MMA
2010 Bazzie Award for Fight of the Year vs. Jorge Santiago

Mixed martial arts record

|-
| Win
| align=center| 25–11–2 (1)
| Paul Daley
| Decision (split)
| Strikeforce: Tate vs. Rousey
| 
| align=center| 3
| align=center| 5:00
| Columbus, Ohio, United States
| Welterweight debut.
|-
| Win
| align=center| 24–11–2 (1)
| Akira Shoji
| TKO (punches)
| DEEP: 53 Impact
| 
| align=center| 2
| align=center| 1:13
| Tokyo, Japan
| 
|-
| Win
| align=center| 23–11–2 (1)
| Mike Seal
| TKO (punches)
| World Victory Road Presents: Soul of Fight
| 
| align=center| 1
| align=center| 1:15
| Tokyo, Japan
| 
|-
| Loss
| align=center| 22–11–2 (1)
| Jorge Santiago
| TKO (corner stoppage)
| World Victory Road Presents: Sengoku Raiden Championships 14
| 
| align=center| 5
| align=center| 4:30
| Tokyo, Japan
| For the Sengoku Middleweight Championship; Fight of the Year.
|-
| Loss
| align=center| 22–10–2 (1) 
| Melvin Manhoef
| TKO (punches)
| Dynamite!! 2009
| 
| align=center| 1
| align=center| 1:49
| Saitama, Japan
| 
|-
| Win
| align=center| 22–9–2 (1)
| Kazuhiro Nakamura
| Technical Submission (guillotine choke)
| World Victory Road Presents: Sengoku 9
| 
| align=center| 1
| align=center| 3:03
| Saitama, Japan
| 
|-
| Loss
| align=center| 21–9–2 (1)
| Jorge Santiago
| Technical Submission (rear-naked choke)
| World Victory Road Presents: Sengoku no Ran 2009
| 
| align=center| 5
| align=center| 3:26
| Saitama, Japan
| For the Sengoku Middleweight Championship.
|-
| Win
| align=center| 21–8–2 (1)
| Joe Riggs
| TKO (punches)
| Strikeforce: At The Mansion II
| 
| align=center| 2
| align=center| 2:29
| Beverly Hills, California, United States
| 
|-
| Win
| align=center| 20–8–2 (1)
| Logan Clark
| Decision (unanimous)
| World Victory Road Presents: Sengoku 3
| 
| align=center| 3
| align=center| 5:00
| Saitama, Japan
| 
|-
| Win
| align=center| 19–8–2 (1)
| Siyar Bahadurzada
| Submission (guillotine choke)
| World Victory Road Presents: Sengoku First Battle
| 
| align=center| 2
| align=center| 2:02
| Tokyo, Japan
| 
|-
| NC
| align=center| 18–8–2 (1)
| Yoshihiro Akiyama
| No Contest
| Yarennoka
| 
| align=center| 1
| align=center| 7:48
| Saitama, Japan
| Originally knockout win; Akiyama was hit with illegal soccer kick.
|-
| Loss
| align=center| 18–8–2
| Frank Trigg
| Decision (unanimous)
| PRIDE 33
| 
| align=center| 3
| align=center| 5:00
| Nevada, United States
| 
|-
| Win
| align=center| 18–7–2
| Denis Kang
| Decision (split)
| PRIDE Bushido 13
| 
| align=center| 2
| align=center| 5:00
| Yokohama, Japan
| Won PRIDE 2006 Welterweight Grand Prix; replaced Filho.
|-
| Loss
| align=center| 17–7–2
| Paulo Filho
| Submission (armbar)
| PRIDE Bushido 13
| 
| align=center| 1
| align=center| 9:43
| Yokohama, Japan
| PRIDE 2006 Welterweight Grand Prix Semifinal.
|-
| Win
| align=center| 17–6–2
| Dan Henderson
| Decision (unanimous)
| PRIDE Bushido 12
| 
| align=center| 2
| align=center| 5:00
| Nagoya, Japan
| PRIDE 2006 Welterweight Grand Prix Quarterfinal.
|-
| Win
| align=center| 16–6–2
| Phil Baroni
| Decision (unanimous)
| PRIDE Bushido 11
| 
| align=center| 2
| align=center| 5:00
| Saitama, Japan
| PRIDE 2006 Welterweight Grand Prix Opening Round.
|-
| Loss
| align=center| 15–6–2
| Dan Henderson
| Decision (unanimous)
| PRIDE Bushido 10
| 
| align=center| 2
| align=center| 5:00
| Tokyo, Japan
| 
|-
| Win
| align=center| 15–5–2
| Akira Shoji
| Technical Submission (guillotine choke)
| DEEP: 23 Impact
| 
| align=center| 1
| align=center| 2:32
| Tokyo, Japan
| 
|-
| Loss
| align=center| 14–5–2
| Daniel Acacio
| Decision (Unanimous)
| PRIDE Bushido 8
| 
| align=center| 2
| align=center| 5:00
| Nagoya, Japan
| 
|-
| Win
| align=center| 14–4–2
| Flavio Luiz Moura
| Submission (north-south choke)
| Pancrase: Spiral 2
| 
| align=center| 2
| align=center| 2:13
| Yokohama, Japan
| 
|-
| Loss
| align=center| 13–4–2
| Nate Marquardt
| Decision (unanimous)
| Pancrase: Brave 10
| 
| align=center| 3
| align=center| 5:00
| Tokyo, Japan
| For the King of Pancrase Middleweight Championship.
|-
| Win
| align=center| 13–3–2
| Ed Herman
| Technical Submission (arm-triangle choke)
| Pancrase: 2004 Neo-Blood Tournament Final
| 
| align=center| 2
| align=center| 3:31
| Tokyo, Japan
| 
|-
| Win
| align=center| 12–3–2
| Jorge Patino
| Decision (unanimous)
| PRIDE Bushido 3
| 
| align=center| 2
| align=center| 5:00
| Yokohama, Japan
| 
|-
| Win
| align=center| 11–3–2
| Kiuma Kunioku
| TKO (doctor stoppage)
| Pancrase: Brave 1
| 
| align=center| 2
| align=center| 1:31
| Tokyo, Japan
| 
|-
| Draw
| align=center| 10–3–2
| Jake Shields
| Draw
| Pancrase: Hybrid 10
| 
| align=center| 3
| align=center| 5:00
| Tokyo, Japan
| 
|-
| Loss
| align=center| 10–3–1
| Ricardo Almeida
| Decision (majority)
| Pancrase: 10th Anniversary Show
| 
| align=center| 3
| align=center| 5:00
| Tokyo, Japan
| 
|-
| Win
| align=center| 10–2–1
| Yuji Hisamatsu
| Submission (rear-naked choke)
| Pancrase: Hybrid 5
| 
| align=center| 3
| align=center| 2:34
| Yokohama, Japan
| 
|-
| Draw
| align=center| 9–2–1
| Yuji Hisamatsu
| Draw
| Pancrase: Hybrid 3
| 
| align=center| 2
| align=center| 5:00
| Tokyo, Japan
| 
|-
| Win
| align=center| 9–2
| Joe D'Arce
| TKO (punches)
| Pancrase: Hybrid 1
| 
| align=center| 2
| align=center| 4:51
| Tokyo, Japan
| 
|-
| Win
| align=center| 8–2
| Masaya Kojima
| Submission (armbar)
| Pancrase: Spirit 8
| 
| align=center| 1
| align=center| 4:40
| Yokohama, Japan
| 
|-
| Win
| align=center| 7–2
| Kousei Kubota
| Decision (unanimous)
| Pancrase: 2002 Anniversary Show
| 
| align=center| 3
| align=center| 5:00
| Yokohama, Japan
| 
|-
| Loss
| align=center| 6–2
| Nate Marquardt
| TKO (broken arm)
| Pancrase: Spirit 3
| 
| align=center| 1
| align=center| 0:29
| Tokyo, Japan
| 
|-
| Win
| align=center| 6–1
| Ryuki Ueyama
| Decision (unanimous)
| Pancrase: Spirit 2
| 
| align=center| 3
| align=center| 5:00
| Umeda Stella Hall
| 
|-
| Loss
| align=center| 5–1
| Chris Lytle
| Decision (unanimous)
| Pancrase: Proof 7
| 
| align=center| 3
| align=center| 5:00
| Yokohama, Japan
| 
|-
| Win
| align=center| 5–0
| Takaku Fuke
| KO (punches)
| Pancrase: Proof 6
| 
| align=center| 1
| align=center| 0:08
| Tokyo, Japan
| 
|-
| Win
| align=center| 4–0
| Hiroki Nagaoka
| Submission (guillotine choke)
| Pancrase: 2001 Neo-Blood Tournament Second Round
| 
| align=center| 2
| align=center| 1:21
| Tokyo, Japan
| 
|-
| Win
| align=center| 3–0
| Seiki Ryo
| Decision (split)
| Pancrase: 2001 Neo-Blood Tournament Second Round
| 
| align=center| 3
| align=center| 5:00
| Tokyo, Japan
| 
|-
| Win
| align=center| 2–0
| Hikaru Sato
| Submission (rear naked choke)
| Pancrase: 2001 Neo-Blood Tournament Opening Round
| 
| align=center| 1
| align=center| 4:08
| Tokyo, Japan
| 
|-
| Win
| align=center| 1–0
| Kenichi Serizawa
| Decision (unanimous)
| Pancrase: 2001 Neo-Blood Tournament Eliminations
| 
| align=center| 3
| align=center| 5:00
| Japan
|

See also 
 List of male mixed martial artists

References

External links 
 

Living people
1976 births
People from Katori, Chiba
Japanese male mixed martial artists
Middleweight mixed martial artists
Mixed martial artists utilizing judo
Mixed martial artists utilizing kickboxing
Japanese male judoka
Sportspeople from Chiba Prefecture